Bolshoy Kundysh (Kugu Kundyš, literally Great Kundysh) is a river in Kirov Oblast and Mari El, Russia, a right tributary of the Bolshaya Kokshaga. It is 173 km long, its drainage basin is 1710 km². Bolshoy Kundysh flows across the fen of the Mari Depression. Kilemary settlement is placed on Bolshoy Kundysh. The river is feed mostly by snow.

References
 Агроклиматический справочник по Марийской АССР, 1961

Rivers of Mari El